Oleg Savchenko (October 25, 1966, Saryg-Sep, Kaa-Khemsky District) is a Russian political figure and deputy of the 4th, 5th, 6th, and 8th State Dumas. 

After graduating from the university, Savchenko worked at the Moscow Radio Engineering Plant. In 1996, he was appointed director of the gold mining enterprise at the Mayskoye deposit in the Chukotka Autonomous Okrug. From 1998 to 2000, he was an assistant to a member of the Federation Council. Since 2003, he was elected deputy of the 4th, 5th, and 6th State Dumas. Since September 2021, he has served as deputy of the 8th State Duma.

In 2021, Savchenko became 22nd in the Forbes ranking of the wealthiest civil servants in Russia.

In March 2022, Italian authorities, as a reaction to 2022 Russian invasion of Ukraine, confiscated Savchenko's villa in Tuscany.

References

1966 births
Living people
United Russia politicians
21st-century Russian politicians
Eighth convocation members of the State Duma (Russian Federation)
Sixth convocation members of the State Duma (Russian Federation)
Fifth convocation members of the State Duma (Russian Federation)
Fourth convocation members of the State Duma (Russian Federation)